Sir Charles Sladen,  (28 August 1816 – 22 February 1884), Australian colonial politician, was the 6th Premier of Victoria.

Sladen was born in England near Walmer, Kent, the second son of John Baker Sladen, deputy-lieutenant of the county. He was educated at Shrewsbury and later at Trinity Hall, Cambridge. In 1840, he graduated with a Bachelor of Laws (LLB). He migrated to Australia in 1841, and in February 1842 arrived in the Port Phillip District (later Victoria). He was soon admitted to the Victorian bar, and practised as a solicitor in Geelong until 1854, when he took up farming near Winchelsea. In 1840 he married Harriet Amelia Orton. In 1851–52 he played cricket for Victoria.

On 28 November 1855 Sladen was nominated to the Victorian Legislative Council, and was appointed acting Treasurer. When Victoria gained responsible government in 1856, Sladen was elected to the Victorian Legislative Assembly as Member for Geelong, and became Treasurer in the ministry of William Haines, a position he held until March 1857. He advocated the creation of a public bank and increased immigration. Sladen did not contest the 1859 election and contested but lost the 1861 election for Geelong East.

A firm conservative, Sladen re-entered politics in November 1864 when he was elected to the Legislative Council for Western Province in a by-election. When the liberal Premier James McCulloch resigned in May 1868 during the conflict between the government and the Council over the proposed grant to retiring Governor Charles Darling, Sladen was asked by the new Governor, Sir John Manners-Sutton, to form a government.

Sladen found himself in a hopeless situation, since he was a member of the upper house at a time when it was increasingly accepted that the leader of the government must come from the Assembly – he is the only member of the Council ever to serve as Premier. Since he had little support in the Assembly, his government had no prospect of long-term survival. Following the resolution of the Darling grant crisis, he stepped down in July, and in September he retired from the council.

In September 1876 Sladen was again elected to the Council for Western Province, and became the de facto leader of the Council in its conflicts with the Assembly. Despite being very conservative, Sladen recommended that the franchise for the Council be extended, and that the property qualifications for membership be reduced. These reforms were enacted in 1881. Sladen retired in 1882 due to poor health and died in 1884 in Geelong.

Sladen was created a Knight Commander of the Order of St Michael and St George (KCMG) in 1875. A portrait of him hangs in the National Gallery of Victoria in Melbourne.

References 

Geoff Browne, A Biographical Register of the Victorian Parliament, 1900–84, Government Printer, Melbourne, 1985
Don Garden, Victoria: A History, Thomas Nelson, Melbourne, 1984
Kathleen Thompson and Geoffrey Serle, A Biographical Register of the Victorian Parliament, 1856–1900, Australian National University Press, Canberra, 1972
 Raymond Wright, A People's Counsel. A History of the Parliament of Victoria, 1856–1990, Oxford University Press, Melbourne, 1992
 
 
 

1816 births
1884 deaths
19th-century Australian lawyers
Knights Commander of the Order of St Michael and St George
Politicians awarded knighthoods
Premiers of Victoria
Politicians from Geelong
Alumni of Trinity Hall, Cambridge
English emigrants to colonial Australia
People from Walmer
Victoria (Australia) state politicians
Australian cricketers
Victoria cricketers
Melbourne Cricket Club cricketers
Australian sportsperson-politicians
19th-century Australian politicians
Members of the Victorian Legislative Council
Treasurers of Victoria
Members of the Victorian Legislative Assembly